In gynaecology, Cusco's self-retaining bivalved speculum is a kind of speculums, used for vaginal and cervical examinations. It has a jaw that opens up like a duck bill.

The instrument was named after French surgeon Édouard-Gabriel Cusco (1819–1894).

It comes in three models: side screw, centre screw, and special narrow virgin size. However, smaller and larger sizes are available. Cusco's speculum is used for introducing an intrauterine contraceptive device, taking a Pap smear, cauterization of vaginal erosion, and colposcopic examination. It is preferred in cryosurgery because it protects the anterior and posterior vaginal wall. The advantage of Cusco's speculum is that it is self-retaining. Therefore, an assistant's help is not needed to keep the speculum in place. It also acts as the vaginal wall retractor. However, it reduces the space in the vaginal cavity and therefore is not a preferred instrument for vaginal surgery. Because it covers most of the vaginal wall, small lesions on the vaginal wall may be masked by the blades of the device.

References

Surgical instruments
Gynaecology